The University of Mississippi's Center for Intelligence and Security Studies (or CISS), located on the University of Mississippi campus in Oxford, Mississippi, was created in 2008 and is housed in the university's School of Applied Sciences.  CISS's primary mission is to deliver academic programming to prepare outstanding students for careers in intelligence analysis in both the public and private sectors. In addition, CISS personnel engage in applied research and consortium building with government, private and academic partners.

Recognition as a Center of Academic Excellence 

In late 2012 The Director of National Intelligence designated the Center for Intelligence and Security Studies at the University of Mississippi as an Intelligence Community Center of Academic Excellence ("CAE"). CISS is one of only 29 college programs in the United States with this distinction. CAE schools receive funding from the federal government to develop academic courses, fund student travel, and run conferences and workshops.

Days of Intrigue Intelligence Exercise 

The CISS hosts an annual practical intelligence exercise, developed by Melissa Graves and Walter Flaschka. The latest exercise was held on April, 2013, and dealt with a fictional pandemic flu outbreak. ISS student analysts were joined by student scholars visiting from other Center of Academic Excellence schools and organized into one of five agencies, CIA, DIA, FBI, NSA, and State Department. The exercise leads students through a realistic national security or all-hazards disaster scenario similar to what they might face one day as intelligence analysts.

Academic Offering 

The center offers a minor in Intelligence and Security Studies (ISS) that is designed to complement a major course of study in areas of highly desirable core competencies such as foreign languages, engineering, and international studies. Unlike other minors at the University of Mississippi, students must apply for and be accepted into the minor once they have become students at the university. Criteria for acceptance include an excellent GPA, strong communication skills and exceptional motivation for a career in analytics.

The minor consists of the following six mandatory courses; students generally complete upper-level courses in their junior and senior years:
 ISS 125 Introduction to Intelligence Studies
 ISS 350 Fundamentals of Analysis
 ISS 375 Intelligence Communications
 ISS 480 National Security Issues of the 21st Century
 ISS 490 Internship
 ISS 499 Capstone Project

Students 

CISS selects its cohorts of students through a vigorous application process that includes personal statements, essays, letters of reference and an interview. CISS selected its third cohort of 16 students in March 2011. The 2012 cohort students represented 9 majors and 6 languages spoken with different degrees of fluency. The average GPA was 3.78.

Represented majors: Accountancy, Arabic, Biology, Business, Chemical Engineering, Chinese, Civil Engineering, Classics, Criminal Justice, Economics, English, French, Geology, History, International Studies, Marketing Communications, Political Science, Psychology, Public Policy, Religious Studies, Spanish.

Represented minors: Anthropology, Arabic, French, German, History, Japanese, Latin, Military Science and Leadership, Portuguese, Russian, Spanish, Theater.

Represented Languages: Arabic, Chinese, English, French, German, Japanese, Latin, Portuguese, Russian, Spanish

See also 
Homeland Security Centers of Excellence

References

External links 
 Center for Intelligence and Security Studies website
 The University of Mississippi, School of Applied Sciences website
 The University of Mississippi's website

University of Mississippi
Intelligence education